Le baiser et la quittance, ou Une aventure de garnison (The Kiss and the Receipt, or A Garrison Adventure) is an opera by the composers Étienne Méhul, François-Adrien Boieldieu, Rodolphe Kreutzer and Nicolas Isouard. It takes the form of an opéra bouffon in three acts. It premiered at the Opéra-Comique, Paris on 18 June 1803. The libretto is by Picard, Longchamps and Dieulafoy. The work was a failure and only ran for four performances.

References

Sources
Adélaïde de Place Étienne Nicolas Méhul (Bleu Nuit Éditeur, 2005)
Arthur Pougin Méhul: sa vie, son génie, son caractère (Fischbacher, 1889)
General introduction to Méhul's operas in the  introduction to the edition of Stratonice by M. Elizabeth C. Bartlet (Pendragon Press, 1997)

Operas by multiple composers
Operas by Étienne Méhul
Operas by François-Adrien Boïeldieu
Operas by Nicolas Isouard
1803 operas
Opéras comiques
French-language operas
Operas